Amberleyidae is an extinct family of sea snails, marine gastropod mollusks in the clade Vetigastropoda (according to the taxonomy of the Gastropoda by Bouchet & Rocroi, 2005).

This family has no subfamilies.

Genera 
 † Amberleya J. Morris and Lycett, 1851 (species type : †Amberleya bathonica Cox & Arkell, 1950)

References